Drew Plantation is a plantation in Penobscot County, Maine, United States. The population was 26 at the 2020 census. It is part of the Bangor Metropolitan Statistical Area. The Surety of Sinners Orthodox Mission, a Russian Orthodox church, is located in Drew.

Geography
The Mattawamkeag River flows through the plantation.

Demographics

At the 2000 census there were 57 people in 17 households, including 12 families, in the plantation.  The population density was 1.5 people per square mile (0.6/km). There were 37 housing units at an average density of 1.0 per square mile (0.4/km).  The racial makeup of the plantation was 91.23% White, 5.26% African American, and 3.51% from two or more races.
Of the 17 households 35.3% had children under the age of 18 living with them, 70.6% were married couples living together, and 29.4% were non-families. 23.5% of households were one person and 23.5% were one person aged 65 or older. The average household size was 3.35 and the average family size was 4.00.

The age distribution was 33.3% under the age of 18, 5.3% from 18 to 24, 28.1% from 25 to 44, 17.5% from 45 to 64, and 15.8% 65 or older. The median age was 35 years. For every 100 females, there were 119.2 males. For every 100 females age 18 and over, there were 90.0 males.

The median household income was $26,667 and the median family income  was $43,125. Males had a median income of $32,500 versus $100,000 for females. The per capita income for the plantation was $15,249. There were no families and 3.1% of the population living below the poverty line, including no under eighteens and none of those over 64.

References

Plantations in Penobscot County, Maine
Plantations in Maine